Sermilik Station is a glaciology research station on Ammassalik Island, dedicated to the research of the nearby Mittivakkat Glacier. The station is located on the west side of the Ammasalik island in south east Greenland, on the shore of the Sermilik Fjord. The station is not permanently staffed but visiting researchers work there during the summer months.

The station was built in 1970 to provide the logistical base for the research. The closest settlement is Tasiilaq, around a day away by foot. The station is situated on a popular hiking route around the island.

In 1972, the main building was destroyed by an avalanche. It was rebuilt later closer to the shore, which is its current location.

See also

List of research stations in the Arctic
 Dye 3
 Eismitte
 Ice core
 Liverpool Land
 Milne Land
 NEEM Camp
 North Ice
 Renland
 Scoresby Sund
 Summit Camp

References 

 
 

Research stations in Greenland
Glaciology